In cryptography, the Full Domain Hash (FDH) is an RSA-based signature scheme that follows the hash-and-sign paradigm. It is provably secure (i.e., is existentially unforgeable under adaptive chosen-message attacks) in the random oracle model. FDH involves hashing a message using a function whose image size equals the size of the RSA modulus, and then raising the result to the secret RSA exponent.

Exact security of full domain hash
In the random oracle model, if RSA is -secure, then the full domain hash RSA signature scheme is -secure where,
.

This means that if there exists an algorithm that can forge a new FDH signature that runs in time t, computes at most  hashes, asks for at most  signatures and succeeds with probability , then there must also exist an algorithm that breaks RSA with probability  in time .

References
Jean-Sébastien Coron(AF): On the Exact Security of Full Domain Hash. CRYPTO 2000: pp. 229–235 (PDF)
Mihir Bellare, Phillip Rogaway: The Exact Security of Digital Signatures - How to Sign with RSA and Rabin. EUROCRYPT 1996: pp. 399–416 (PDF)

Digital signature schemes
Theory of cryptography